Paul N. Tine (born December 20, 1971) was a member of the North Carolina House of Representatives, serving since 2013. Tine is also an insurance agent. Elected as a Democrat in 2012 and 2014, Tine left that party in January 2015, changed his registration to "Unaffiliated," and said he would caucus with the Republican House majority.

Committee assignments

2015-2016 session
Appropriations (Vice Chair)
Appropriations - Transportation (Chair)
Commerce and Job Development
Education - Community Colleges
Insurance (Vice Chair)
Judiciary IV
Rules, Calendar, and Operations of the House
Transportation
Wildlife Resources

2013-2014 session
Commerce and Job Development
Education
Finance
Insurance
Regulatory Reform
Transportation

Electoral history

2014

2012

References

External links
 
Legislative page
Twitter account

Living people
1971 births
People from West Virginia
People from Dare County, North Carolina
James Madison University alumni
Members of the North Carolina House of Representatives
21st-century American politicians
North Carolina Democrats
North Carolina Independents